The 2020 Invictus Games was an adaptive multi-sport event for wounded, injured and ill veteran and active defence personnel, that took place in The Hague, Netherlands in April 2022, after having been postponed twice. It was the fifth edition of the Invictus Games.

Development and preparation 
The games were to be held on 9–16 May 2020 at the Zuiderpark, but were postponed to 2021 due to the COVID-19 pandemic. They were then postponed again to the spring of 2022. The opening ceremony on 16 April 2022 was attended by the event's founding patron Prince Harry, Duke of Sussex, and his wife Meghan, Duchess of Sussex. Also in attendance were Princess Margriet of the Netherlands, who is the Honorary Chair of the committee of recommendation of the 2020 Invictus Games and who christened the official Invictus Games Tulip in June 2021, and her son Prince Pieter-Christiaan. Representatives of participating nations were also present. King Willem-Alexander of the Netherlands attended the closing ceremony on 22 April 2022.

The Royal Dutch Mint was announced as the sponsor and designer of the medals and other special sporty issues for the games.

The Games

Participating countries 
The 18 participating countries of the 2018 Invictus Games were invited back, along with new invitations to Belgium and South Korea.

Due to COVID measures, Jordan, Afghanistan and New Zealand could not attend. The 17 participating countries were:

 
 
 
 
 
 
 
 
 
 
  (host)
 
 
 
 
 
 

Another team titled "Unconquered" also participated in certain events consisting of competitors from multiple nations.

Sports
There are 9 adaptive sports contested at the Games as well as the Land Rover Driving Challenge.

Land Rover Driving Challenge

Medalists

Land Rover driving challenge

Archery

Athletics
Men

Women

Mixed

Indoor rowing
Men

Women

Powerlifting

Road cycling
Men

Women

Swimming
Men

Women

Mixed

Team sports

Media and broadcast
The games will be documented in a Netflix documentary called Heart of Invictus. Alex Jones and JJ Chalmers covered the event in a 6 episode nightly recap programme on BBC One from 17 to 22 April 2022. On 8 April 2022, the British embassy in The Netherlands announced the podcast series Invictus Voices, which features interviews with the competitors.

References

2020
Invictus Games
Invictus Games
Invictus Games
Invictus Games